Barraza or Barrasa may refer to:

People with the surname
Adriana Barraza (born 1956), Mexican actress, acting teacher and director
Jacinto Barraza (born 17th century - died 1704), Peruvian Jesuit historian
Juana Barraza (born 1957), Mexican former professional wrestler and serial killer 
Julio Barraza (born 1980), Argentine footballer
Juan Francisco Barraza (1935–1997), El Salvador footballer
Pancho Barraza, Mexican singer/songwriter

Places
Estadio Juan Francisco Barraza, a multi-purpose stadium in San Miguel, El Salvador

Other
 Barraza (katydid), a genus of katydids in the subfamily Tettigoniinae